Rush Creek may refer to:

Communities
 Rush Creek, Queensland, Australia
 Rush Creek, Wise County, Texas, U.S., a ghost town
 Rush Creek Township, Fairfield County, Ohio, U.S.

Waterways
 Rush Creek (New South Wales), a tributary of the Hawkesbury-Nepean catchment, in New South Wales, Australia
 Rush Creek (Marin County, California)
 Rush Creek (Mono County, California)
 Rush Creek (Colorado)
 Rush Creek (Kishwaukee River tributary), a stream in Illinois
 Rush Creek (Root River tributary), a stream in Minnesota
 Rush Creek (Missouri River), a stream in Missouri
 Rush Creek (Texas), a tributary of Village Creek in Tarrant County, Texas

Other 

 Rush Creek Open Space Preserve

See also